The Cantabria autonomous basketball team is the basketball team of Cantabria. The team is not affiliated to FIBA, so only plays friendly games.

History
Cantabria played its first friendly game on 9 July 2012, against Senegal.

Roster
This is the roster of the Cantabria team for the 2012 game.

|}
| valign="top" |
 Head coach

Legend
(C) Team captain
Club field describes pro clubduring the 2011–12 season
|}

Games played

References

External links
Cantabrian Federation website

    
Basketball
Cantabria